Ann Cole Gannett is an American Republican politician from Wayland, Massachusetts. She represented the 53rd Middlesex district in the Massachusetts House of Representatives from 1969 to 1980.

See also
 1969-1970 Massachusetts legislature
 1971-1972 Massachusetts legislature
 1973-1974 Massachusetts legislature
 1975-1976 Massachusetts legislature
 1977-1978 Massachusetts legislature
 1979-1980 Massachusetts legislature

References

Year of birth missing
Year of death missing
Members of the Massachusetts House of Representatives
Women state legislators in Massachusetts
20th-century American women politicians
20th-century American politicians
People from Wayland, Massachusetts